Kirk Michael Game (born 22 October 1966) is a former professional footballer who played as a defender and midfielder for Southend United, Colchester United and a number of semi-professional football clubs in England.

Early life
Game was raised in Essex where he played in local junior leagues as a boy for Hadleigh Town, Blenheim Sports and Leigh Ramblers.

Club career

Southend United
Game joined Southend United at the age of eleven and gradually worked his way through the playing ranks. He represented the under-18 youth team at fifteen whilst still at school and regularly trained with the first team squad during his school breaks. He signed as an apprentice at sixteen, became captain of the youth team and eventually the reserves.

He was offered a professional contract just after his seventeenth birthday by Bobby Moore, then manager of Southend. Game turned down a new contract he left the club for local rivals Colchester United.

Colchester United and later career
Former Everton and Norwich manager, Mike Walker, then manager of Colchester United, signed Game and it wasn't long before he made his return to his old club to secure a well earned draw. He made 29 appearances in the Football League for Colchester.

After several successful seasons Game took up a new challenge by moving to Europe where he played in Germany.

He returned to England a year later to play semi-professional for Dartford who were managed by Peter Taylor.

He remained at non-League level for the rest of his career playing for Chelmsford City, Heybridge Swifts, Dagenham & Redbridge, Billericay Town, Braintree Town.

Coaching career
Game became football coach having achieved the UEFA 'A' licence and has been a coach/manager at the Youth Academy of West Ham United.

He also has many years experience as a secondary school P.E. Teacher, personal fitness trainer and has run many independent soccer schools and coaching clinics in England and the USA. He now manages the full-time U19 Academy at Heybridge Swifts with former West Ham United player Stuart Slater.

References

1966 births
Living people
People from Rochford
English footballers
English Football League players
Southend United F.C. players
Colchester United F.C. players
Dartford F.C. players
Chelmsford City F.C. players
Dagenham & Redbridge F.C. players
Billericay Town F.C. players
Braintree Town F.C. players
Heybridge Swifts F.C. players
Association football defenders
Chelmsford City F.C. non-playing staff
Association football coaches
West Ham United F.C. non-playing staff